Porte de Montreuil is a station on line 9 of the Paris Métro. The station has four tracks, two of which are sidings. Like that of Porte de Charenton, the train hall boasts an unusually wide vault, at 22.5 m across. The station is named after the Porte de Montreuil, a gate in the nineteenth century Thiers wall of Paris, which led to the town of Montreuil. Flea markets are held on the glacis (the sloping bank in front of a wall) of the fortifications.

The station was opened on 10 December 1933 with the extension of the line from Richelieu - Drouot. It was the eastern terminus of the line until the extension of the line to Mairie de Montreuil on 14 October 1937. An interchange with Paris tramway Line 3b opened on 15 December 2012.

Station layout

References

Roland, Gérard (2003). Stations de métro. D’Abbesses à Wagram. Éditions Bonneton.

Paris Métro stations in the 20th arrondissement of Paris
Railway stations in France opened in 1933